Lene Barlie (born 1973) is a Norwegian sport wrestler who represented the club SK av 1909.

She won a bronze medal at the 1993 World Wrestling Championships. She was awarded the King's Cup at the 1993 Norwegian championships.

References

Norwegian female sport wrestlers

Living people
1973 births
World Wrestling Championships medalists
20th-century Norwegian women
21st-century Norwegian women